is a Japanese fencer. She competed in the women's individual sabre events at the 2004 and 2008 Summer Olympics.

References

External links
 

1979 births
Living people
Japanese female sabre fencers
Olympic fencers of Japan
Fencers at the 2004 Summer Olympics
Fencers at the 2008 Summer Olympics
Sportspeople from Kumamoto Prefecture
Asian Games medalists in fencing
Fencers at the 2002 Asian Games
Fencers at the 2006 Asian Games
Asian Games bronze medalists for Japan
Medalists at the 2002 Asian Games
Medalists at the 2006 Asian Games
20th-century Japanese women
21st-century Japanese women